The Radio Neutrino Observatory Greenland (or RNO-G) is a neutrino observatory deployed near Summit Camp on top of the Greenland ice sheet. The goal of the RNO-G experiment is detecting ultra-high energy neutrinos and estimating their flux. These particles could help to better understand the most violent events in the universe, including but not limited to active galactic nuclei (AGN) and gamma ray bursts (GRB). A neutrino detection by RNO-G would also extend the energy range at which neutrinos can be used for multi-messenger astronomy.

Detector Layout 
  

By 2022 seven stations have been deployed and are taking data. Each station consists of three in-ice strings at 100m depth to measure particle cascades in ice induced by neutrinos and other particles and a surface component that is also sensitive to cosmic rays. The stations operate autonomous and are powered by renewable energies, such as solar panels and wind turbines. The communication is wireless via LTE.

Detection principle 

An event view from simulations for RNO-G. The neutrino induced particle cascade creates radio emission via the Askaryan effect. This is strongest at the Cherenkov angle at 56°, here shown as a red cone. The radio signal will propagate to the detector according to the ice density (direct and reflected). On the right shown are signals in the surface antennas (upper panel), the reconstruction antennas (middle) and the phased array trigger (lower panel).

See also 
Other Radio Neutrino Experiments:
 Radio Ice Cherenkov Experiment (RICE)
 Askaryan Radio Array (ARA)
Antarctic Ross Ice-Shelf Antenna Neutrino Array (ARIANNA)
 Antarctic Impulsive Transient Antenna (ANITA)

References 

Neutrino astronomy
Astroparticle physics